Jacob von T(h)yboe , or simply Jacob von Thyboe, is a satirical play first published by Ludvig Holberg in 1723.  It premiered at the Lille Grønnegade Theatre in Copenhagen in 1725.

Plot summary
Leonard is poor but wants to marry the fair Lucilia. His two rivals, Jakob von Thyboe, a soldier, and Styge Stygotius, are both wealthy and well-spoken.

Adaptions
DR has produced a made-for-television movie of Jacob von Thyboe that premiered on 13 March 1966. It was directed by Ulf Stenbjørn and the cast included Aksel Erhardtsen, John Larsen, Eddie Karnil and Olaf Ussing.

References

External links

 Jacob von Tyboe

1723 plays
Enlightenment philosophy
Plays by Ludvig Holberg
Plays set in Denmark